Lake Don Pedro may refer to:
 Don Pedro Reservoir, a man-made lake in Tuolumne County, California 
 Lake Don Pedro, California, a census-designated place in Mariposa County, California